Mohamed Yousif (محمد يوسف; born 25 May 1991) is an Emirati international footballer who plays for Ajman as a goalkeeper.

Honours 
Al-Ahli Dubai F.C.
Winner
 UAE Arabian Gulf Cup: 2011–12

Runner-up
 GCC Champions League: 2011

External links 
 

1991 births
Living people
Emirati footballers
2015 AFC Asian Cup players
Dubai CSC players
Al Ahli Club (Dubai) players
Sharjah FC players
Al-Nasr SC (Dubai) players
Khor Fakkan Sports Club players
Ajman Club players`
United Arab Emirates international footballers
UAE First Division League players
UAE Pro League players
Association football goalkeepers